Eismitte, in English also called Mid-Ice, was the site of an Arctic expedition in the interior of Greenland that took place from July 1930 through August 1931, and claimed the life of noted German scientist Alfred Wegener.

The coldest temperature recorded during the expedition was −64.8 °C (−84.6 °F) on March 20, 1931, while the warmest temperature noted was −1.8 °C (28.8 °F) on July 9, 1931. For the 12-month period beginning August 1, 1930 and ending August 5, 1931, the warmest month, July, had a mean monthly temperature of −12.2 °C (10 °F), while the coldest month, February, averaged −47.2 °C (−53 °F). Over the same period a total of 110 millimeters (4.33 inches) of water-equivalent precipitation was recorded, with most of it, rather surprisingly, being received in winter. At the latitude of the camp, the sun does not set between May 13 and July 30 each year, and does not rise between November 23 and January 20.

Sorge pit 1930
Ernst Sorge was a member of the Alfred Wegener Expedition to Eismitte in central Greenland from July 1930 to August 1931. He hand-dug a 15 m deep pit adjacent to his beneath-the-surface snow cave, which served as his living quarters during his seven-month-long wintering-over stint. Sorge was the first to systematically and quantitatively study the near-surface snow/firn strata from inside his pit. After meticulous examination of the structural features and careful measurement of continuous density and other physical properties within the pit profile, Sorge determined the characteristics of the individual limits of annual snow accumulation. This research validated the feasibility of measuring the preserved annual snow accumulation cycles, like measuring frozen precipitation in a rain gauge.

Climate
Eismitte is one of the coldest locations in the Northern Hemisphere, with an annual mean temperature of  having been recorded during the period of the expedition. Eismitte has a polar ice cap climate.  A weather station was run for approximately one year; the weather record thus is very sparse. The Summit Camp station slightly to the north has a similar climate with a much longer period of record.

See also
North Ice
Summit Camp
NEEM Camp
Camp Century
Renland
Pole of inaccessibility

References

External links 
 Hourly meteorological observations at station Eismitte by Johannes Georgi.

History of Greenland

1930 in science
1931 in science
Arctic expeditions